The 1977 French Grand Prix was a Formula One motor race held at Dijon on 3 July 1977. It was race 9 of 17 in both the 1977 World Championship of F1 Drivers and the 1977 International Cup for F1 Constructors.

The 80-lap race was won by American driver Mario Andretti, driving a Lotus-Ford, after he started from pole position. Northern Irishman John Watson led for most of the race in his Brabham-Alfa Romeo, before Andretti passed him on the final lap. Watson finished 1.55 seconds behind the American, with Englishman James Hunt third in his McLaren-Ford.

Austrian Niki Lauda finished fifth in his Ferrari to take the lead of the Drivers' Championship from South African Jody Scheckter, who failed to finish in his Wolf-Ford.

Report
Once again it was Mario Andretti on pole with James Hunt second and Gunnar Nilsson third on the grid. Hunt got the best start and led into the first corner from John Watson and Jacques Laffite, with Andretti dropping down to fourth. However, Watson passed Hunt on the fifth lap and started to build a gap until Andretti got up to second and began to reel him in. During the final few laps, leader Watson and Andretti were running nose-to-tail but Watson held him off till the last lap when his engine missed a beat and immediately Andretti was past. Andretti thus took the win ahead of a crestfallen Watson and Hunt.

Classification

Qualifying classification

Race classification

Championship standings after the race

Drivers' Championship standings

Constructors' Championship standings

References

French Grand Prix
French Grand Prix
1977 in French motorsport